Hisonotus leucofrenatus is a species of catfish in the family Loricariidae. It is native to South America, where it occurs in the Ribeira de Iguape River basin. The species reaches 6 cm (2.4 inches) SL.

References 

Otothyrinae
Fish of South America
Fish described in 1908